The Barratt Due Institute of Music in Oslo, Norway, is a music education institute founded in 1927 by pianist Mary Barratt Due and violinist Henrik Adam Due. It is situated in Fagerborg in Oslo and is a private foundation which receives government funding for parts of its activities. The institute provides music education for many age groups, including infants and children, school-aged adolescents, and undergraduate and postgraduate students.

The institute's motto is "From music kindergarten to concert podium," which sums up the philosophy that constitutes the foundation on which their education system is built. Children receive musical training from an early age, and students are offered education on undergraduate and postgraduate levels, preparing them for the professional musical career and arena. This education model has enabled Barratt Due to establish itself as an important institution and contribute largely to the Norwegian classical music industry at least for the past three generations.

Stephan Barratt-Due is the Barratt Due's artistic director, and leads the institute's ensemble-in-residence, Oslo Camerata.

History 
Barratt Dues Musikkinstitutt (Barratt Due Institute of Music) was founded on 18 September 1927 in the residence of Henrik Due and Mary Barratt Due, in 18 Vallegata, St. Hanshaugen. Classes and lessons were then held in their apartment home. Both musicians were well-established and acknowledged during their time, and the family moved into Lyder Sagens gate 2 on 26 October 1931, where the institute is located today. Certain traditions, such as the annual Christmas concert, were held since 1930. In January 1931, the music kindergarten was established, becoming the first of its kind in the country and leading to the establishment of the motto "From music kindergarten to concert podium" in the mid-1930s. Today it is the oldest music kindergarten still in operation in Norway.

During World War II, Barratt Dues musikkinstitutt was a meeting place for those who were interested in culture and what was considered as Degenerate music, which was banned during the war.

In 1985, Barratt Dues Juniororkester and Barratt Dues Symfoniorkester were established, and in 1986 the institute was turned into a foundation. Stephan Barratt-Due Jr. became the rector and artistic director of the institute in 1985.

Departments 
 Høyskoleavdeling (College Department) offers Bachelor and master's degree studies in Music Performance, in addition to PPU (Practical Pedagogical Education) and a FE (Further Education) course in music didactics.
 Unge Talenter (Young Talents) is catered towards the youths in the ages of 10 to 19 with a particular interest and talent in music. The programme includes instrumental lessons, ensemble activities and music theory.
 Musikk på Majorstuen is a programme for school-aged children residing in Oslo, and provides primary education that particularly facilitates the needs of talented youths within classical music. This programme is a collaboration between Barratt Due and Majorstuen Skole.
 Musikkskoleavdeling (Music School Department) offers individual instrumental lessons for newbeginning pupils in the ages of 6 to 9 in string instruments, piano, oboe and bassoon.
 Musikkbarnehage (Music Kindergarten) is organised into age-divided groups for young children in the ages of 0 to 5. The training and the learning material is adjusted to the children's personal development levels. Through various stimulating activities such as song, dance and improvisation, the children become familiar with music and its creative forms, and may develop a musical interest and basic musical skills that create the foundation for further training. The music kindergarten has been a crucial part of Barratt Due's educational offers since the beginning, and supports the institute's philosophy that music knows no age limits.

Affiliated orchestras and ensembles 
 Oslo Camerata: Barratt Due's ensemble-in-residence, a professional orchestra in which a selection of students may participate.
 Barratt Dues Kammerfilharmoni: A small philharmonic orchestra composed of undergraduate and postgraduate students.
 Barratt Dues Vokalensemble: A chamber choir composed of all the college students in vocal studies, led by Lars Notto Birkeland.
 Barratt Dues Messingensemble: A brass ensemble composed of all the college students in brass studies, led by Sverre Riise.
 Barratt Dues Unge Symfoniorkester: A full symphony orchestra composed of students of Unge Talenter and/or under 20 years old, led by Alf Richard Kraggerud.
 Barratt Dues Juniororkester: A junior string orchestra composed of students of Unge Talenter and/or between the ages of 13 to 19, who come from all around the country; led by Soon-Mi Chung.
 Barratt Dues Juniorensemble: A junior string orchestra composed mainly of students between the ages of 12 to 16, led by Sigyn Fossnes.
 Barratt Dues Barneorkester: A junior string orchestra composed of children under 13 years old, led by Torfinn Hoffart.

Notable alumni and faculty 

Current and former students
 Stephan Henrik Barratt-Due
 Eva Knardahl
 Terje Venaas
 Stephan Barratt-Due
 Henning Kraggerud
 Vilde Frang
 Hilde Hefte
 Eldbjørg Hemsing 
 Ragnhild Hemsing
 Alexander Rybak
 Didrik Solli-Tangen
 Annar Follesø
 Tine Thing Helseth
 Frode Barth
 Birgitta Elisa Oftestad

Current and former teachers
 Henrik Adam Due
 Mary Barratt Due
 Stephan Henrik Barratt-Due
 Ørnulf Gulbransen
 Jiri Hlinka
 Stephan Barratt-Due
 Soon-Mi Chung
 Henning Kraggerud
 Michael Endres
 Fredrik Fors
 Solveig Kringlebotn
 Wolfgang Plagge

References

External links 
 

 
Majorstuen
1927 establishments in Norway
Educational institutions established in 1927
Education in Oslo
Music schools in Norway
Foundations based in Norway
Organisations based in Oslo
Arts organizations established in 1927